Kossakowski was an aristocratic family of Mazovian origin.

They were first mentioned in the 13th century and initially settled in Ciechanów County, from where they branched out to the Grand Duchy of Lithuania, Podolia, Volhynia, and Livonia.

Coat of arms
Coat of arms of the Kossakowski family was Ślepowron.

Famous members
 Jan Nepomucen Kossakowski (1755–1808), bishop of Inflanty and later of Vilna
 Józef Dominik Kossakowski (1771–1840), colonel, member of the Targowica Confederation, son-in-law of Stanisław Szczęsny Potocki
 Józef Kossakowski (1772–1842), general of French army, aide-de-camp of Napoleon
 Józef Kazimierz Kossakowski (1738–1794), bishop of Inflanty, a member of the Targowica Confederation
 Józef Kossakowski (1807–1857), printer in Lublin
 Józef Ignacy Kossakowski (1757–1829), political and educational activist
 Szymon Marcin Kossakowski (1741–1794) one of the leaders of the Targowica Confederation and the last Great Hetman of Lithuania.
 Jan Kossakowski (died 1680) member of the Sejm
 Antoni Kossakowski (1718–1786) – poet
 Michał Kossakowski (1733–1798) – voivode of Witebsk and Bracław Voivodeship
 Antoni Kossakowski (1735–1798) – castelan in Livonia
 Jakub Kossakowski (1752–1784) – podstoli of Kowno
 Jan Nepomucen Kossakowski (1755–1808) – bishop of Inflanty and Wilno
 Adam Kossakowski (1756–1828) – auxiliary bishop of Inflanty and Wilno, Jesuit
 Jarosław Michał Kossakowski (1842–1889) – participated in the January Uprising
 Michał Stanisław Kossakowski (1883–1962) – landowner, diplomat, banker
 Jan Kossakowski (1900–1979) – physician, surgeon
 Józef Kossakowski (1917–1988) – ichthyologist
 Eustachy Kossakowski (1925–2001) – photographer
 Zofia Kossakowska (born 1924) – art historian
 Barbara Kossakowska (1927–2007) – architect
 Andrzej Kossakowski (1929–1992) – art historian
 Jerzy Kossakowski (born 1952) – member of the Sejm
 Grzegorz Kossakowski, Polish bobsledder

Palaces

References

Notes